"Don't You See!" is the 19th single by Japanese rock band Zard. It was released on 8 cm CD on January 6, 1997 under B-Gram Records. The single reached No. 1 rank first week and would go on to chart for 14 weeks, selling more than 600,000 copies. The song was written by the band's vocalist, Izumi Sakai and would serve as the second closing theme song for Dragon Ball GT. Following Sakai death in 2007, it would be ranked as her sixth best song on the Oricon polls.

Track list

References

1997 singles
Zard songs
Oricon Weekly number-one singles
Dragon Ball songs
Songs written by Izumi Sakai
Japanese-language songs
Songs written by Seiichiro Kuribayashi
1997 songs